Gazi Mustafa Kemal Boulevard, abbreviated as GMK Boulevard, is a boulevard connecting Anadolu Square (formerly: Tandoğan Square) in Yenimahalle with Kızılay Square in Çankaya of Ankara, Turkey. It is named after Mustafa Kemal Atatürk (1881–1938), the founder of Turkish Republic.

Office buildings of some branches of the Ministry of Transport, Maritime and Communication, such as Undersecretariat for Maritime Affairs, 
Aviation and Space Technologies and Civil Aviation, are located on the boulevard.

References

External links

Streets in Ankara
Yenimahalle, Ankara
Çankaya, Ankara
Transportation in Ankara
Things named after Mustafa Kemal Atatürk